Interpretaciones del Oso is a remix album by Minus the Bear, released on February 20, 2007 through Suicide Squeeze Records. Various artists reinterpreted and remixed songs from their second full-length Menos el Oso. "Interpretaciones del Oso" means "Interpretations of the Bear" in Spanish.

Track listing

Personnel

Jake Snider - Vocals, Guitar
Dave Knudson - Guitar
Erin Tate - Drums
Cory Murchy - Bass
Matt Bayles - Electronics

Other personnel
Mastered by Ed Brooks

External links
SuicideSqueeze.net

Suicide Squeeze Records albums
Minus the Bear albums
2007 remix albums